Conilon Futebol Clube de Jaguaré, commonly known as Conilon, is a Brazilian football club based in Jaguaré, Espírito Santo state. The club was formerly known as Botafogo Futebol Clube de Jaguaré.

History
The club was founded in 2011, as Botafogo Futebol Clube de Jaguaré, adopting similar colors, logo and kits as Rio de Janeiro-based club Botafogo de Futebol e Regatas. Botafogo de Jaguaré won the Campeonato Capixaba Second Level in 2011, after defeating Real Noroeste in the final. The first leg, played on June 4, in Águia Branca, ended in a 1–1 draw, and in the second leg, in Jaguaré, played on June 11, they beat the opponent 5–0. The club was renamed to Conilon Futebol Clube de Jaguaré in late November.

Achievements

 Campeonato Capixaba Second Level:
 Winners (1): 2011

Stadium
Conilon Futebol Clube de Jaguaré play their home games at Centro Esportivo Conilon., also known as Estádio Municipal de Jaguaré and as Estádio do Conilon. The stadium has a maximum capacity of 5,000 people.

References

Association football clubs established in 2011
Football clubs in Espírito Santo
2011 establishments in Brazil